Fight with Tools is the debut album by Flobots, originally released in October 2007 and re-released on May 20, 2008. The album was recorded in 2007 around the band's home state of Colorado. Fight with Tools received a mildly positive reception from critics who praised the production and serious subject matter. The album features the single "Handlebars" which became a popular hit on Modern Rock radio the following April, also becoming a popular hit in the UK (#14), New Zealand (#26) and Canada (#63). The album also features the single "Rise" which also became a popular hit on Modern Rock radio after its release. In the week of June 7, 2008, the album jumped on the Billboard 200 chart 168 places and peaked at number 15, selling over 265,000 copies. The album also peaked at number 52 on the UK Albums Chart.

Critical reception

Fight with Tools garnered a mildly positive reception from music critics who praised the production and attention to political topics. Steve 'Flash' Juon of RapReviews praised the album for its use of live instrumentation and the lyrical delivery of both Jonny 5 and Brer Rabbit, concluding with, "The versatility of the Flobots sound makes them very hard to pin down, but it also makes for an entertaining musical journey that doesn't get bogged down by their politics or a preachy didactic presentation." AllMusic's David Jeffries also complimented the band for having the ambition to tackle various political messages while backed with a live orchestra, saying that "Good points are made with skill and fine wordplay, the guitars and drums crunch along driving home the message with head-bobbing grooves, and the album opens up with the marvelous "Handlebars," a carefully crafted, slowly building tale of the ego run wild via some beautiful muted trumpet." James Greene, Jr. of PopMatters criticized the album for failing to recapture what Rage Against the Machine brought before and for being preachy in its political messages, saying that "At the end of the day, Flobots and their sophomore effort can be summed up by the album’s third track, "Same Thing". As the chorus demonstrates, they’re just saying the same things over again, giving us the same revolutionary slogans anti-establishment forces have been shouting in the face of 'The Man' for years: "We want money for healthcare and public welfare / free Mumia and Leonard Peltier!"" The track ¨The Rhythm Method (Move!)¨ is known for being one of the very few hip-hop songs in an odd-time signature, being in 7/8.

Track listing

Personnel
Adapted credits from the Fight with Tools booklet.

Flobots
 0. Brer Rabbit – rapping vocals
 5. Jonny 5 – rapping vocals 
 17. Andy Guerrero – guitar, additional vocals
 33. Mackenzie Roberts – viola, vocals
 69. Kenny O. – drums
 101. Jesse Walker – bass

Additional musicians
 Joe Ferrone – trumpet (tracks 2, 3, 5, 6, 7)
 Mariel Roberts – cello (tracks 1, 4, 5, 11, 12)
 Minnie Baldwin – vocals (track 11)
 Ravi Zupa – sample (track 9)
 Dr. Vincent Harding and the Veterans of Hope Project – samples (track 10)

Production
 Flobots – production
 Kyle Jones – mixing, mastering

Artwork
 Jonathan Till – art and design
 Matt Walker – photography

Charts

Weekly charts

Year-end charts

References

2007 debut albums
Flobots albums
Universal Republic Records albums